The Hall of Transportation, Treasure Island, on Treasure Island, California, also known as Building 2, was built in 1938 for the 1939-40 Golden Gate International Exposition. It served as the hall of transportation for the exposition. It was constructed with the idea that it would serve as an airplane hangar after the Exposition but it never did. It was designed in Moderne style by architects William Peyton Day and George William Kelham.  It was listed on the National Register of Historic Places in 2008.

References

Buildings and structures in San Francisco
Treasure Island, San Francisco
Golden Gate International Exposition
Buildings and structures completed in 1938
Buildings and structures on the National Register of Historic Places in California
World's fair architecture in California
Moderne architecture in California
National Register of Historic Places in San Francisco
1938 establishments in California